Eddie Leslie (11 October 1903, in Camberwell, Surrey, England – 27 June 1975 (age 71) in West Chiltington, Sussex, England) was a British film actor and screenwriter.

He often acted alongside Norman Wisdom, on stage and in his films Trouble in Store (1953); Up in the World (1956); Just My Luck (1957); The Square Peg (1958); Follow a Star (1959) and A Stitch in Time (1963). He wrote five of Wisdom's film screenplays as well as a couple of early TV shows for Wisdom in 1952. In 1956 he appeared in the first episode of Hancock's Half Hour TV show. His theatre credits include the role of Luther Billis in the musical South Pacific by Rodgers and Hammerstein and Joshua Logan in Glasgow's Alhambra Theatre in 1954. He performed with Patrica Hartley, Nevil Whiting, Helen Landis, David Williams, Robert Henderson and Sean Connery.

References

External links 
 

1903 births
1975 deaths
English male film actors
English male screenwriters
20th-century English male actors
20th-century English screenwriters
20th-century English male writers
People from Camberwell
People from West Chiltington